Susan Sims Harrell Black (born October 20, 1943) is an American lawyer and a Senior United States circuit judge of the United States Court of Appeals for the Eleventh Circuit. She was a former United States District Judge of the United States District Court for the Middle District of Florida. She was the first female federal court judge in Florida.

Education and career

Black was born in Valdosta, Georgia. She earned her Bachelor of Arts degree from Florida State University in 1964 and her Juris Doctor from the University of Florida College of Law in 1967. Black was a high school teacher in Jacksonville, Florida from 1967 to 1968 and an attorney for the United States Army Corps of Engineers in Jacksonville from 1968 to 1969. From 1969 to 1972 she served as assistant state attorney in Jacksonville and from 1972 to 1973 she served as assistant general counsel for the City of Jacksonville.

State judicial service

Black was a judge in Duval County Court from 1973 to 1975 and was a judge in the Fourth Judicial Circuit (Duval, Clay, and Nassau counties) from 1975 to 1979.

Federal judicial service

President Jimmy Carter nominated Black to the United States District Court for the Middle District of Florida on May 22, 1979, to a new seat created by 92 Stat. 1629. Confirmed by the Senate on July 23, 1979, she received her commission the next day. Black served as Chief Judge from 1990 to 1992. She received a Master of Laws from the University of Virginia School of Law in 1984. Her service terminated on September 3, 1992, due to elevation to the Eleventh Circuit.

President George H. W. Bush nominated Black to the United States Court of Appeals for the Eleventh Circuit on March 10, 1992, to the seat vacated by Judge Thomas Alonzo Clark. Confirmed by the Senate on August 11, 1992, she received her commission the next day and began serving on the court on September 3, 1992. On February 25, 2011, Black  assumed senior status.

See also
List of first women lawyers and judges in Florida

Notes

References
  

1943 births
Living people
20th-century American judges
21st-century American judges
Florida State University alumni
Fredric G. Levin College of Law alumni
Judges of the United States Court of Appeals for the Eleventh Circuit
Judges of the United States District Court for the Middle District of Florida
People from Valdosta, Georgia
United States court of appeals judges appointed by George H. W. Bush
United States district court judges appointed by Jimmy Carter
University of Virginia School of Law alumni
20th-century American women judges
21st-century American women judges